Comilla-1 is a constituency represented in the Jatiya Sangsad (National Parliament) of Bangladesh since 2008 by Mohammad Shubid Ali Bhuiyan of the Awami League.

Boundaries 
The constituency encompasses Daudkandi and Megna upazilas.

History 
The constituency was created for the first general elections in newly independent Bangladesh, held in 1973.

Ahead of the 2008 general election, the Election Commission redrew constituency boundaries to reflect population changes revealed by the 2001 Bangladesh census. The 2008 redistricting altered the boundaries of the constituency.

Members of Parliament

Elections

Elections in the 2010s

Elections in the 2000s

Elections in the 1990s

Notes

References

External links
 

Parliamentary constituencies in Bangladesh
Cumilla District